Rock Out is the sixth studio album by Australian hard rock band Wolfmother. Recorded at frontman Andrew Stockdale's home studio and Bangalow Plaza Studios with engineer Cameron Lockwood, it was independently released on 12 November 2021. The album features a lineup of Stockdale on vocals, guitar and bass, Hamish Rosser on drums, and Alexx McConnell on bass for "Humble" and "Only Way". Fraser Lewry of Classic Rock magazine praised opening track "Feelin Love", writing that the song "is typical, with both a riff and a vocal that conjure up the sound of Black Sabbath at the less doomy end of the Sabbath spectrum".

Track listing

Personnel
Andrew Stockdale – vocals, guitar, bass 
Alexx McConnell – bass 
Hamish Rosser – drums
Cameron Lockwood – engineering and mixing
Paul Pilsneniks – engineering and mixing

References

External links
Rock Out on DistroKid

2021 albums
Wolfmother albums